Kennebec is a medium- to late-maturing white potato. It was bred by the USDA and selected by Presque Isle Station, Maine, in 1941. Kennebec is not under plant variety protection. This fast-growing variety has high yields. It maintains good quality in storage and is grown for both fresh market use and for potato chip manufacturing.

Botanical characteristics 
 The Kennebec plant is non-pigmented, large and erect, with thick stems that are prominently angled.
 Sprouts are grayish green with a slightly purple bottom.
 The leaves are broad, long and dark green with slightly pubescent midribs.
 Primarily the leaflets are ovate, large and grow in pairs of four.  Secondary leaflets occur in a medium number. Tertiary leaflets occur very seldom, if at all. Terminally, the leaflets stay ovate and have acute tips and a lobed base.
 Very few of the large white flowers emerge from the scantly pubescent green buds.
 Tubers are medium thick with an elliptical to oblong shape. The skin is smooth and creamy with shallow eyes.

Agricultural characteristics 
 Kennebec is resistant to tuber net necrosis, which Potato leafroll virus causes.
 It is moderately resistant to foliage late blight, black leg, fusarium dry rot, phoma rot, potato wart, seed-piece decay, PVS and PVX.
 It is susceptible to common scab, fusarium dry rot, tuber late blight, leaf roll, pink eye, and Rhizoctonia.
 It is highly susceptible to Verticillium wilt.

References 

Potato cultivars